The Eshelman FW-5 was a 1940s American experimental cabin monoplane designed and built at Dundalk, Maryland by the Cheston L. Eshelman Company.

Design and development
The FW-5 was a cantilever low-wing monoplane, it had an unusual wing planform in which the wing centre-section was blended into the fuselage, this gave rise to the name The Wing. It had a fixed tailwheel landing gear and was powered by a  Avco Lycoming flat-six piston engine. The enclosed cabin had room for a pilot and three passengers. First flown in 1942 only two aircraft were built.

Specifications

References

Notes

Bibliography

1940s United States civil utility aircraft
Low-wing aircraft
Aircraft first flown in 1942
Single-engined tractor aircraft
Conventional landing gear